Sucidava (Sykibid, Skedevà after Procopius, Σucidava after Vasile Pârvan, where Σ is pronounced "sh") is a Dacian and Daco-Roman historical site, situated in Corabia, Romania, on the north bank of the Danube. The first Christian Basilica established in Romania can be found there and the foot of a Roman bridge over the Danube built by Constantine the Great to link Sucidava with Oescus (today in Bulgaria, in Moesia), in order to start the reconquest of Dacia. There is also a secret underground fountain which flows under the walls of the town to a water spring situated outside.

From an archaeological point of view, the coins found at Sucidava show an uninterrupted series from Aurelian (270-275) to Theodosius II (408-450). The archaeological evidence show that in AD 443 or 447 the city was sacked by the Huns, and was restored under Justin I 518-527 or Justinian I 527-565. Around 600, it seems that the Roman garrison abandoned the city.

See also
List of castra

References

Additional References
 Paul Lachlan MacKendrick, "The Dacian Stones Speak", Chapel Hill: University of North Carolina Press, 1975. 
 Notitia Dignitatum cca 395-413

External links

 Sucidava on Tabula Peutingeriana: http://www.euratlas.net/cartogra/peutinger/7_thracia/thracia_4_1.html
  "Archaeological Excavation Report"
 Photo gallery
 Gabriel Vasile, "Analiza antropologică a unui schelet descoperit la Sucidava - Celei (judeţul Olt)",  Cercetări Arheologice, 13/2006, at National Museum of Romanian History
 http://www.threemonkeysonline.com/als/_sucidava_romania_eu_expansion.html
Roman castra from Romania - Google Maps / Earth

Dacian fortresses in Olt County
Former populated places in Eastern Europe
Roman Dacia
Archaeological sites in Romania
Corabia
Historic monuments in Olt County